Minden is a city in the German state of North Rhine-Westphalia.

Minden may also refer to:

Places

Australia
 Minden, Queensland

Canada
 Minden, Ontario

Germany
Minden, Rhineland-Palatinate
Minden, North Rhine-Westphalia

New Zealand
Minden, New Zealand

United States
 Minden, Alabama
 Minden, Iowa
 Minden, Louisiana
 Minden, Minnesota, a ghost town in Benton County, Minnesota
 Minden, Mississippi
 Minden, Lawrence County, Missouri
 Minden, Warren County, Missouri, a ghost town in Warren County, Missouri
 Minden, Montana, an unincorporated community in Meagher County, Montana
 Minden, Nebraska
 Minden, Nevada
 Minden, New York
 Minden, South Carolina, an unincorporated community in Chesterfield County, South Carolina
 Minden, Texas
 Minden, West Virginia
 Mindenmines, Missouri
 Minden City, Michigan
 Minden Township, Pottawattamie County, Iowa
 Minden Township, Michigan
 Minden Township, Benton County, Minnesota
 New Minden, Illinois

Hong Kong
 Minden Row

People
Judah Löb Minden (18th-century), German lexicographer
Löb ben Moses Minden (died 1751), ḥazzan and poet
Lion Van Minden (1880–1944), Dutch Olympic fencer

Other uses
 SS Minden, a German cargo ship, sank in 1939
 The М-1085 Minden, an ex-German minesweeper, now in service with the Georgian Navy
 HMS Minden, a Royal Navy ship, 1810
 Battle of Minden, 1759
 Minden Day (August 1), the commemoration of the Battle of Minden, celebrated by the regiments of the British Army who fought in it

See also
 Mindon (disambiguation)
Munden (disambiguation)